Abhiman Singh Basnet/Basnyat was first Commander-in-Chief of Unified Nepal. Abhiman Singh became the first Commander in Chief of a United Nepal after General Kalu Pande died during his second attempt to capture Kirtipur.

He had participated in invasion of Makawanpur during Unification of Nepal. He commanded battles in Sino-Nepalese War as subordinate commander under Chautariya Shree Krishna Shah. He commanded and annexed Tanahun Kingdom into unified Nepal.

In 1794 AD, King Rana Bahadur Shah dissolved government to overthrow Bahadur Shah of Nepal. Kirtiman was appointed as Chief (Mul) Kaji among the four Kajis  succeeding Abhiman Singh. In 1857 B.S., he was sent to settle the area of the  Kirata regional areas comprising;  Pallo Kirant Limbuwan , Majh Kirant Khambuwan and Wallo Kirant  , then called Kaala Banzaar. It was a great injustice to him to being sent to this area at such age when he was already a Mulkazi. Abhiman Singh died at the age of fifty-six in 1857. He was reported to have died from a fever, possibly malaria.

Early life and family
He was born on 1744 AD as third son of Basnyat nobleman Senapati Badabir Shivaram Singh Basnyat, who died in the battle of Sanga Chowk during Unification of Nepal on 1803 B.S. (1747 AD). He belonged to a Chhetri family. His father was of Shreepali Basnyat pedigree and his mother Surprabha was daughter of a Bagale Thapa nobleman.

Abhiman Singh had three brothers. His two elder brothers were Kazi Naahar Singh Basnyat and Kazi Kehar Singh Basnyat. His youngest brother, Kazi Dhokal Singh Basnyat, who became the governor of Kumaun, was the first owner of the present Narayanhity Palace.

Gallery

References

Sources

 

Mulkajis
1800 deaths
Basnyat family
Nepalese generals
Nepalese military personnel
1744 births
People of the Nepalese unification
People from Gorkha District
Nepalese Hindus